General Store is the debut album by American singer/songwriter Owen Temple. It was released in 1997 on El Paisano Records.

Track listing
All songs (Temple) except where noted
“When I Hit San Antone” - 3:59
“Me and Maria” - 3:43
“Tennessee Highway” (Temple, Lendon Lewis) - 3:58
“Dry Creek” - 3:16
“Jaded Lover” (Chuck Pyle) - 3:47
“The Wanna Wanna Bar” - 4:31
“Mary” - 3:57 	
“You Never Can Tell” - 3:00 	
“James' Blues” - 3:28 	
“If You Called” - 3:45

Credits

Musicians
 Owen Temple - Acoustic
 Lloyd Maines - Electric guitar, Acoustic, Pedal steel, Mandolin, and Dobro
 John Inmon - Electric guitar, Acoustic
 Michael Tarabay - Bass 
 Richard Bowden - Fiddle, Mandolin
 Rich Brotherton - Mandolin
 Riley Osbourn - keyboards
 Bob Livingston - Harmonica
 Stan Smith - Clarinet
 John Treanor - Washboard
 Bukka Allen - Accordion
 Mark Patterson - drums 
 Fred Remmert - percussion
 Cory Morrow - Vocals on "Jaded Lover"
 Pat Green - Vocals on "Jaded Lover"
 Paul Lee - Harmony vocals on "When I Hit San Antone", "Tennessee Highway", "Mary", "The Wanna Wanna Bar", "Jaded Lover", and "You Never Can Tell"
 Terri Hendrix - Harmony vocals on "If You Called" 
 Graham Sones - Harmony vocals on "Me and Maria" and "James' Blues"

Production
Produced by Lloyd Maines
Engineered by Fred Remmert
Recorded at Cedar Creek Studios, Austin, Texas

Artwork
Art Direction/Design by Jennifer Jones
Photography by Stephen L. Clark

Releases

Cover art

The cover art depicts Temple standing in front of the Fischer Store, a structure located in Fischer, Texas that dates back to 1902.

External links 
Owen Temple website
El Paisano Records website

References 

Owen Temple albums
1997 debut albums